Carver Creek is a stream in Carver County, Minnesota, in the United States.

Carver Creek was named for Jonathan Carver by the explorer himself.

See also
List of rivers of Minnesota

References

Rivers of Carver County, Minnesota
Rivers of Minnesota